Patrick Malachy Corr (31 March 1927 – 29 January 2017) was a Northern Irish football centre forward, best remembered for his time in the Irish League with Glenavon. He made one appearance in the Football League for Burnley.

Career statistics

Honours 
Glenavon

 Irish League: 1956–57
 Irish Cup: 1956–57
 Gold Cup: 1956–57

References

Association footballers from Northern Ireland
NIFL Premiership players
Association football forwards
1927 births
People from Enniskillen
Coleraine F.C. players
English Football League players
Burnley F.C. players
Northern Ireland amateur international footballers
2017 deaths
Glenavon F.C. players
Irish League representative players
Northern Ireland B international footballers

Ballymena United F.C. players